Callimetopus acerdentibus is a species of beetle in the family Cerambycidae. It was described by Dela Cruz and Adorada in 2012.

References

Callimetopus
Beetles described in 2012